Puntzi Mountain Airport  is located  west of Puntzi Mountain, British Columbia, Canada.

History
The airport was established in 1951 to provide access to a base of the Pine Tree Line, part of the DEW system. It was the second-longest airstrip in British Columbia at the time. 13 D8 bulldozers were on site to keep the runway graded and, in winter, cleared of snow. 100 American servicemen and a few Canadian servicemen, some with families, staffed the base at Puntzi, which also hired local Tsilhqot'in people.

References

Registered aerodromes in British Columbia
Chilcotin Country
1951 establishments in British Columbia